Nell Minow is an American film reviewer and writer who writes and speaks frequently on film, media, and corporate governance and investing. Ms. Minow was named one of the 20 most influential people in corporate governance by Directorship magazine in 2007. She was dubbed "the queen of good corporate governance" by BusinessWeek Online in 2003 and has received Lifetime Achievement awards from both the International Corporate Governance Network and Corporate Secretary Magazine.

Career
According to Rotten Tomatoes,

Minow writes as the "Movie Mom" about movies, television, the Internet, and parenting; her "Media Mom" column appeared in the Chicago Tribune and her weekly advisory for parents about the new movie releases appears in the Chicago Sun-Times and the Kansas City Star. Minow's articles have appeared in other newspapers and magazines, including USA Today and Slate. Minow reviews movies every week on radio stations across the United States and in Canada.

Her reviews, blog, interviews, commentary, and other features appeared on Beliefnet from 2005-2017 and have also appeared on HuffPost, and thecredits.org. Minow is a member of the Online Film Critics Society, the Broadcast Film Critics Association, the Washington D.C. Area Film Critics Association, and the Association of Women Film Journalists.

Minow wrote the "Risky Business" column for BNET and was a member of the board of GMI Ratings (formerly The Corporate Library, where she was editor, chair, and co-founder), an independent research company, until August 2014, when it was acquired by MSCI.   She is now vice chair of ValueEdge Advisors.  She has co-written three books in the field with Robert A.G. Monks and is founder and editor of Miniver Press, a publishing company.

She was formerly Principal of LENS, an "investment firm that bought stock in under-performing companies and used shareholder activism to increase their value." In addition, she was dubbed "the CEO Killer" by Fortune magazine for her record of ousting non-performing CEOs at companies like Sears, American Express, Kodak, and Waste Management. Furthermore, she "served as general counsel and then President of Institutional Shareholder Services, Inc., a firm that advises institutional investors on issues of corporate governance, and as an attorney at the Environmental Protection Agency, the Office of Management and Budget, and the United States Department of Justice."

Minow frequently comments on the financial markets in the press and on television, including twice annual appearances on the Motley Fool Money podcast and op-eds in the Wall Street Journal, New York Times, Chicago Tribune, and USA Today, and on network news broadcasts. She has reportedly "written more than 200 articles about corporate governance" and has contributed to a number of business books.

Minow was prominently featured in an October 2009 article in "The New Yorker" about CEO compensation.

Bibliography

The Movie Mom's Guide to Family Movies (Avon, 1999; iUniverse, 2d edition, 2004).
Power and Accountability (1991)(with Robert A. G. Monks)
Corporate Governance (editions in 1995, 2001, 2003, 2008, 2011) (with Robert A. G. Monks)
Watching the Watchers: Corporate Governance for the 21st Century (1996)(with Robert A. G. Monks)
Contributed chapters to:
Law Stories
The Dance of Change
The Financial Services Revolution
Leadership and Governance from the Inside Out
How to Run a Company

References
For Investors the Blessed and the Basted

External links
 Movie Mom reviews, blog, interviews, and commentary
 CFO Magazine profile
 New York Times profile
 GMI Ratings website
 Articles on Daylife
 Profile in the Washington Post Magazine
 

American film critics
American women film critics
Chicago Tribune people
Chicago Sun-Times people
Online Film Critics Society
Living people
Sarah Lawrence College alumni
University of Chicago Law School alumni
Writers of blogs about home and family
Year of birth missing (living people)